Grace Borgenicht Brandt (January 25, 1915 – July 19, 2001) was an American art dealer.

Biography
She was born Grace Lubell on January 25, 1915 to a Jewish family in New York City. Her father Samuel L. Lubell founded the Bell Oil and Gas Company, an independent oil refiner in Tulsa, Oklahoma and Lubell Brothers, a shirt manufacturer in New York City. She has two siblings: oil executive Benedict I. Lubell and Shirley Black Kash (formerly married to Eli M. Black). She attended Calhoun School and the New College at Columbia University. In 1934, while still a student, she studied in the studio of the painter André L'Hote in Paris. After returning to New York, she studied printmaking at Stanley William Hayter's Atelier 17 and earned a M.A. in art education from Columbia. After school, she painted professionally, having her first solo show at Chris Ritter's Laurel Gallery in 1947 and later became one of Ritter's primary financial backers. After Ritter closed the Laurel Gallery in 1950, Brandt opened her own gallery, The Grace Borgenicht Gallery, in May 1951. Her gallery focused on living American artists including Milton Avery, Ilya Bolotowsky, Jimmy Ernst, Wolf Kahn, Gabor Peterdi, Leonard Baskin, Edward Corbett, and Ralston Crawford. She represented Avery until his death in 1965 and also represented Gertrude Greene, José de Rivera, Adja Yunkers, James Brooks and Roy Gussow. In 1995, she closed her gallery.

Although known as an art dealer, she continued to paint and showed her work in the 1954 Whitney Annual and had a solo show at the Martha Jackson Gallery in 1955.

Personal life
Brandt married three times. In 1938, she married dress manufacturer Jack Borgenicht; they had three daughters before divorcing, Jan Borgenicht Schwartz, Berta Borgenicht Kerr, and Lois Borgenicht. (Jack would go on to have seven more children including artist Ruth Borgenicht). Her second husband was Norman Sachs Jr.; they also divorced. In 1960, she married her third husband, artist Warren Brandt. She had a stepdaughter, Isabella Brandt Johansen She lived in Manhattan and Watermill, New York. Brandt died in Manhattan on July 19, 2001 at the age of 86 after an accidental fall. Services were held at the Riverside Memorial Chapel.

References

1915 births
2001 deaths
American Jews
American women painters
American art dealers
Women art dealers
20th-century American painters
20th-century American women artists
Painters from New York City
Accidental deaths from falls
Accidental deaths in New York (state)
Teachers College, Columbia University alumni
Borgenicht family